Masters Home Improvement was an Australian home improvement chain operated by retailer Woolworths Limited. It was established as a way for Woolworths Limited to enter the hardware retail market, which has been historically dominated by Bunnings Warehouse, owned by rival Wesfarmers. The two companies also compete with each other with groceries, liquor, fuel and general merchandise. Most of the stores shared the same format of conventional Lowe's Home Improvement stores, and borrowed elements from Bunnings Warehouse for its garden and trade areas.

The joint venture was ultimately a failure for Woolworths Limited, accumulating losses of over A$3.2 billion over a 7-year period, and caused Woolworths to leave the hardware market, with all stores being closed and sold off by 11 December 2016. The failure is regarded as one of the biggest disasters in Australian retail history.

History 
Woolworths announced its plan to enter the Australian hardware sector by establishing a joint venture with United States based hardware chain Lowe's on 25 August 2009. The plan was to develop 150 stores within a 5-year period.

The Masters brand name was announced on 3 May 2011, coinciding with the launch of the website at masters.com.au. Hans Hulsbosch, who has designed brand identities for Woolworths and Qantas, designed the Masters brand and logo.  At that time, there were 14 stores under construction, with building approval for an additional 10.

The first outlet, in Victoria, opened on 31 August 2011. Masters attempted to differentiate from competitors by having stores be brightly lit and colourful by using polished concrete, large colour signage, and store display. They also intended to place an emphasis on attracting female shoppers. Buzzers were scattered around the store, which, when pressed, will send a nearby staff member to that location to help out a customer. While their paint was being tinted, pagers were handed to customers, enabling them to continue shopping. Masters also sold more 'non-hardware' lines such as whitegoods as well as having McDonald's restaurants with McCafés in selected stores. The first stores to open in each state were in Queensland on 11 October 2011, New South Wales on 4 December 2011,  Western Australia, and South Australia in August 2012. It became clear in mid-2013 that the company was struggling. Leadership changes and product-line adjustments did little to improve the situation, and in August 2014 the store roll-out plan had been revised.

The final store to open was at Penrith in New South Wales, which opened in December 2015.

In January 2016, Woolworths announced that it intended to "either sell or wind up" Masters Home Improvement. Chairman Gordon Cairns said that it would take years to become profitable and that the ongoing losses could not be sustained. To facilitate the sale or wind-up, Woolworths would buy back a one-third interest in the joint venture held by the Lowe's subsidiary WDR Delaware Corporation.

Following an 8-month review process in which offers for the business were considered, it was announced on 24 August 2016 that all Masters stores would cease trading on or before 11 December 2016; GA Australia was appointed to manage the sale of inventory, providing an underwritten recovery to deliver gross proceeds of approximately $500 million. Home Consortium, a private joint venture between Aurrum Group, Spotlight Group and Chemist Warehouse, planned to acquire the Masters property portfolio, including 40 freehold trading sites, 21 freehold development sites and 21 leasehold sites. A number of the sites were to be converted into Bunnings Warehouse stores, with the remaining sites to be reformatted into multi tenant large format centres. Woolworths acquired 3 freehold sites and took assignment of 12 leases.

After a 3-month fire sale period, all the stores were shut down on 11 December.

Locations 
There were a total of 63 stores in operation across all mainland states, including one in the Australian Capital Territory (ACT). There were 17 stores in New South Wales, 16 stores in Queensland, 2 in South Australia, 18 in Victoria and 9 in Western Australia. 20 more stores had been planned. The stores were supplied by a small number of warehouse distribution centres. There were no stores in Tasmania or the Northern Territory.

References

External links

 

Woolworths Group (Australia)
Lowe's
Building materials companies of Australia
Retail companies established in 2011
Retail companies disestablished in 2016
Home improvement companies of Australia
2011 establishments in Australia
2016 disestablishments in Australia